Berri may refer to:

People
 Berri (singer), British singer known for her 1995 hit "Sunshine after the Rain"
 Claude Berri (1934-2009), French film director
 David Berri (born 1969), economist and author of The Wages of Wins
 Nabih Berri, Lebanese politician

Places
Berri, South Australia (disambiguation), articles associated with the town and locality in South Australia
 Berri-UQAM (Montreal Metro), a station on the Montreal Metro
Berri Street, a street in Montreal

Other
 Berri, the girlfriend of Conker - see List of characters in the Conker series#Berri

See also
 Beri (disambiguation)
 Berry (disambiguation)
 Berrie, disambiguation page